Gustavo Alfonso Ayón Aguirre (born April 1, 1985) is a Mexican former professional basketball player. His last team was Capitanes de Arecibo of the Baloncesto Superior Nacional (BSN). He also represents the senior Mexican national basketball team in international national team competitions. Ayon is a two−time All-EuroLeague Second Team selection.

Early life and college career
Gustavo was born April 1, 1985, to parents Ayón Ayón and mother Linda Ayón.

Ayón attended at the Universidad Popular Autónoma del Estado de Puebla, in Mexico, for three years of college.  He was named the Most Valuable Player of the Mexican College Championship Tournament, in leading his team to the National Championship.

Following that season, he signed with NCAA Division I San Jose State University. However, Ayón never played for the Spartans, instead choosing to sign with a Mexican professional team, Halcones UV Xalapa.

Professional career

Mexico
In the 2006 season, Ayón saw some action off the bench for Halcones UV Xalapa, as the team finished second in the Liga Nacional de Baloncesto Profesional.  Ayón cracked the team's starting lineup the following season, and eventually led Halcones to back-to-back Mexican league titles, in 2007–08 and 2008–09.  He averaged 10.2 points and 8.1 rebounds per game in 2007–08, and improved on that by averaging 13.2 points and 7.8 rebounds per game the following season.  In what turned out to be his final game for the team, Ayón turned in a dominant, 24-point, 20-rebound, performance in leading his club to a 94–90 overtime victory over Soles de Mexicali, that clinched their second consecutive league title.

Spain
Following the 2008–09 season, Ayón signed with Baloncesto Fuenlabrada of the Spanish League.  In November 2011, Ayón was named the Spanish League's ACB Player of the Month.

NBA
On December 2011, Ayón signed with the New Orleans Hornets, of the NBA, after paying Baloncesto Fuenlabrada with a $1.5-million buy-out clause. Ayón received a three-year contract, with the last year being a team option.

On July 11, 2012, Ayón was traded to the Orlando Magic, in a sign-and-trade deal for Ryan Anderson.

On February 21, 2013, Ayón was traded to the Milwaukee Bucks, along with guards Ish Smith and JJ Redick, for guards Beno Udrih and Doron Lamb, and forward Tobias Harris.

On July 25, 2013, he was waived by the Bucks.

On July 29, 2013, Ayón was claimed off waivers by the Atlanta Hawks. On February 12, 2014, Ayón scored a career high 18 points, in a 83–104 loss to the Toronto Raptors. On February 28, 2014, it was announced that Ayón would miss the rest of the 2013–14 season, following successful surgery to repair a right shoulder injury.

Return to Spain
On September 23, 2014, Ayón signed a two-year deal with Spanish club Real Madrid coached by Pablo Laso. In the 2014–15 season, Real Madrid won the EuroLeague, after defeating Olympiacos, by a score of 78–59 in the league's finals. Real Madrid eventually finished the season by also winning the Spanish League championship, after a 3–0 series sweep in the Spanish League finals series against Barcelona. With that championship, Real Madrid thus won the triple crown.

Ayón was named the EuroLeague MVP of the Round, in the first week of the playoffs, in the 2014–15 season, and in week nine of the regular season of the 2015–16 season.

On January 4, 2016, Ayón was named the EuroLeague MVP of the Month, for December 2015. On May 6, 2016, he was named to the All-EuroLeague Second Team, for the 2015–16 EuroLeague season. In May 2016, he was named the Player of the Month in the Spanish Liga ACB.

On July 14, 2016, Ayón signed a new three-year contract with Real Madrid.

In May 2018, Real Madrid won the 2017–18 EuroLeague championship, after defeating Fenerbahçe Doğuş in the final game with 85–80. Over 17 EuroLeague games, Ayón averaged 9.6 points, 6.1 rebounds and 2.9 assists per game.

In June 2018, Ayón helped guide Real Madrid to the 2017-18 ACB Spanish League Championship by defeating Kirolbet Baskonia.

In June 2019, Ayón helped lead Real Madrid to the 2018-19 ACB Spanish League Championship by defeating FC Barcelona Lassa

Russia
On July 26, 2019, Ayón signed a one-year deal with Zenit Saint Petersburg of the VTB United League and the EuroLeague. He averaged 12 points, 5 rebounds and 2 assists per game. Ayón parted ways with the team on July 26, 2020.

Return to Mexico
On September 30, 2020, Ayón signed with Astros de Jalisco of the Liga Nacional de Baloncesto Profesional.

Puerto Rico
On September 19, 2021, Ayón signed with Capitanes de Arecibo.

Ayón led the Capitanes de Arecibo to the Championship of the Baloncesto Superior Nacional (BSN) of Puerto Rico.  This latest championship is the 16th professional championship for Ayón.

On August 20, 2022, Ayón announced his retirement from professional basketball.

National team career
Ayón has been a member of the senior Mexican national basketball team since 2007. He played center for the seventh placed Mexicans at the 2007 FIBA Americas Championship, and the fifth placed team at the 2008 Centrobasket.

In 2013, Ayón led Mexico to victory in the gold medal game against Puerto Rico at the FIBA Americas Championship.  Ayón was named to the All-Tournament Team, and was named the MVP of the tournament.

In August 2014, Ayón led Mexico to victory in the gold medal game against Puerto Rico at the 2014 Centrobasket.  Ayón was named the MVP of the tournament. Later that month, he joined Mexico for the 2014 FIBA World Cup.

In 2015, Ayón was named to the 2015 FIBA Americas Championship All-Tournament Team, after tallying 17.7 points per game (2nd in the tournament), 12.4 rebounds per game (1st in the tournament), 3.5 assists per game (7th in the tournament), 1.3 steals per game (3rd in the tournament), and 1.2 blocks per game (1st in the tournament).

In June 2018, Ayón helped lead Mexico to a 78-70 victory over Team USA in 2019 FIBA Basketball World Cup qualification (Americas)

Career statistics

NBA

Regular season

|-
| style="text-align:left;"| 
| style="text-align:left;"| New Orleans
| 54 || 24 || 20.1 || .536 || .000 || .619 || 4.9 || 1.4 || 1.0 || .9 || 5.9
|-
| style="text-align:left;"| 
| style="text-align:left;"| Orlando
| 43 || 3 || 13.3 || .536 || – || .500 || 3.3 || 1.4 || .3 || .3 || 3.6
|-
| style="text-align:left;"| 
| style="text-align:left;"| Milwaukee
| 12 || 0 || 13.6 || .595 || – || .083 || 4.9 || 1.0 || .8 || .3 || 4.3
|-
| style="text-align:left;"| 
| style="text-align:left;"| Atlanta
| 26 || 14 || 16.5 || .510 || – || .400 || 4.8 || 1.1 || 1.0 || .4 || 4.3
|- class="sortbottom"
| style="text-align:center;" colspan="2"| Career
| 135 || 41 || 16.7 || .536 || .000 || .504 || 4.4 || 1.3 || .7 || .5 || 4.7

Playoffs

|-
| style="text-align:left;"| 2013
| style="text-align:left;"| Milwaukee
| 3 || 0 || 2.3 || .500 || .000 || .000 || .0 || .0 || .0 || .0 || 1.3
|- class="sortbottom"
| style="text-align:center;" colspan="2"| Career
| 3 || 0 || 2.3 || .500 || .000 || .000 || .0 || .0 || .0 || .0 || 1.3

EuroLeague

|-
| style="text-align:left;background:#AFE6BA;"| 2014–15†
| style="text-align:left;" rowspan=5| Real Madrid
| 29 || 23 || 18.7 || .623 || .000 || .794 || 4.5 || 1.9 || 1.1 || .6 || 8.1 || 11.7
|- class="sortbottom"
| style="text-align:left;"| 2015–16
| 27 || 27 || 26.1 || .622 || .000 || .619 || 7.9 || 2.3 || 1.8 || 1.3 || 11.6 || 18.4
|-
| style="text-align:left;"| 2016–17
| 36 || 36 || 20.6 || .699 || .000 || .485 || 5.2 || 2.3 || .9 || .6 || 9.8 || 13.7
|-
| style="text-align:left;background:#AFE6BA;"| 2017–18†
| 18 || 11 || 23.0 || .577 || .000 || .581 || 5.8 || 2.8 || 1.4 || .8 || 9.3 || 14.2
|-
| style="text-align:left;"| 2018–19
| 31 || 6 || 19.7 || .669 || .000 || .542 || 6.0 || 2.9 || .8 || .8 || 8.3 || 14.5
|- class="sortbottom"
| style="text-align:center;" colspan="2"| Career
| 110 || 97 || 21.8 || .639 || .000 || .599 || 5.8 || 2.3 || 1.3 || .8 || 9.7 || 14.4

Domestic leagues

References

External links
 
 Gustavo Ayón at acb.com 
 Gustavo Ayón at eurobasket.com
 Gustavo Ayón at euroleague.net
 Gustavo Ayón at feb.es 
 Gustavo Ayón  at nba.com
 

1985 births
Living people
2014 FIBA Basketball World Cup players
Astros de Jalisco players
Atlanta Hawks players
Baloncesto Fuenlabrada players
BC Zenit Saint Petersburg players
CB Illescas players
Centers (basketball)
Competitors at the 2018 Central American and Caribbean Games
Halcones de Xalapa players
Liga ACB players
Marinos B.B.C. players
Mexican expatriate basketball people in Spain
Mexican expatriate basketball people in the United States
Mexican expatriate basketball people in Venezuela
Mexican men's basketball players
Milwaukee Bucks players
National Basketball Association players from México
New Orleans Hornets players
Orlando Magic players
Real Madrid Baloncesto players
Sportspeople from Tepic, Nayarit
Tenerife CB players
Undrafted National Basketball Association players